North Loop refers to:

Places 
 North Loop, Minneapolis
 North Loop, Austin, Texas
 North Loop, El Paso, Texas